Ingela Maria Olsson (born 28 February 1958 in Nybro, Sweden) is a Swedish actress.
 
Olsson was active in many different theatre groups during the 1980s. She started working at the Galeasen theatre in 1989, and appeared at Stockholms stadsteater, Parkteatern, Orionteatern, Dramaten, and radioteatern. Her film debut, in 1989 was Annika Silkeberg's Ömheten. She is most commonly known for her part as Inger in Så som i himmelen.

Filmography
2021 - Young Royals (Netflix series)
2004 - As It Is in Heaven
2003 - Detaljer
2003 - Järnvägshotellet (TV)
2002 - Skeppsholmen (TV series guest role)
2001 - Beck – Hämndens pris
2001 - Hans och hennes
2000 - Skärgårdsdoktorn (TV series guest role)
2000 - Dubbel-8
1997 - Emma åklagare (TV series guest role)
1992 - Rederiet (TV series)

References

External links

1958 births
Living people
Swedish actresses